Ibrahim Shekarau (born 5 November 1955) is a former Nigerian minister of education and two-term Governor of Kano State in Nigeria. He was elected in April 2003 and reelected in April 2007. He is a member of the Peoples Democratic  Party (PDP). He was one of the candidates who aspired to become president in the Nigerian general elections of 2011.

Early life and education
Shekarau was born in the Kurmawa quarters of Kano, the son of a police officer. He was educated at Gidan Makama Primary School (1961–1967), then at Kano Commercial College (1967–1973) and finally at Ahmadu Bello University, Zaria (1973–1977) where he received a Degree in Mathematics/Education.

After finishing his Degree, he went into the civil service. Later on, he started his career as a Mathematics teacher at Government Technical College, Wudil in 1978. Two years later he became Principal at Government Day Junior Secondary School, Wudil. In 1980, he was transferred to Government Secondary School, Hadejia, then to Government College Birnin Kudu in 1986, then to Government Secondary School, Gwammaja and then to Rumfa College in March 1988, all as the school's principal.

Career
Shekarau became Deputy Director of Education in charge of Bichi Zonal Education Area in 1992. One year later, he was promoted to Director Planning, Research and Statistics in Ministry of Education. Two years later, he became Director General (Permanent Secretary), Ministry of Education and Youth Development.

In January 1995, Shekarau was transferred to Ministry of Water Resources, Rural and Community Development, then back to Ministry of Education in January – May 1997 before he was asked to move to General Service Directorate of the Cabinet Office, all as Permanent Secretary. By February 2000, he was on the move again to Civil Service Commission, where he stayed for only four months before the civil service commission under Ado Gwaram Government sent him to the State College of Arts, Science and Remedial Studies (CASRS) as Chief lecturer (Mathematics) at the Department of Physical Sciences, in May 2000. Shekarau remained in this post for 17 months before he voluntarily retired from the services of Kano State Civil Service on 2 October 2001. Some time after quitting his post as Chief Lecturer, he decided to work as a secretary to businessman Aminu Dantata. He was employed under Dantata until he became a contender in Kano State's 2003 gubernatorial elections.

In May 2022, Shekarau defected from the ruling  All Progressives Congress (APC) to New Nigeria People's Party (NNPP). Three months later, he announced his defection again to the leading opposition party, PDP.

Governorship
As Governor, Shekarau opposed polio vaccination campaigns on the grounds that they are actually attempts to make Muslim women infertile. The World Health Organization denied this.

He was the driving force behind the creation of the local religious police, the "Hisbah Guard", which enforces Sharia law.

Shekarau initiated some large scale development projects in Kano State. He also hosted some world leaders like the former German Chancellor Schroeder, Prince Charles, among others. The Emir of Kano, Alhaji Ado Bayero conferred on him, the title of Sardauna of Kano, now of the leading emirate councillors.

Presidential bid
Governor Ibrahim Shekarau was one of the candidates for the Nigerian presidential elections of 2011.

See also
List of Governors of Kano State

References

1955 births
Living people
Nigerian Muslims
Governors of Kano State
Bayero University Kano alumni
Ahmadu Bello University alumni
Candidates in the Nigerian general election, 2011
Politicians from Kano State
Politicians from Kano
People from Kano State
Nigerian anti-vaccination activists